Laflèche is a French surname. Notable people with the surname include:

 François-Joseph Laflèche, (1879–1945), Canadian politician
 Léo Richer Laflèche (1888–1956), Canadian general, civil servant, diplomat, and politician
 Louis-François Richer Laflèche (1818–1898), Canadian Catholic bishop

French-language surnames